The following is a list of Arkansas State Red Wolves men's basketball head coaches. The Red Wolves have had 16 head coaches in their 95-season history.

Arkansas State's most recent head coach is Mike Balado. He was hired in March 2017 to replace Grant McCasland, who left to take the head coach position at North Texas.

References

Arkansas State

Arkansas State Red Wolves men's basketball coaches